The Herdman Rocks are two rocks,  high, lying  southeast of Hart Rock and  northeast of Cape Dundas, Laurie Island, in the South Orkney Islands. They were first charted in 1838 by a French expedition under Captain Jules Dumont d'Urville. They were recharted in 1933 by Discovery Investigations and named after Henry F.P. Herdman, for whom Cape Herdman was also named.

References

Rock formations of the South Orkney Islands